The University of Lübeck is a research university in Lübeck, Northern Germany which focuses almost entirely on medicine and sciences with applications in medicine. In 2006, 2009 and 2016, the University of Lübeck was ranked No. 1 in medicine among all universities in Germany, Austria and Switzerland according to the CHE Hochschulranking. In Computer Science and Molecular Life Science, the university was ranked No. 2 in the 2009 evaluation.

General
The university has a Faculty of Medicine and a Faculty of Technology and Natural Sciences. It offers professional degrees and doctoral degrees (in particular, but not only, Dr.med.) in medicine and Bachelor, Master and doctoral degrees in science and engineering disciplines with applications to medicine. Additionally, since 2013 the university extended its portfolio by establishing a department of psychology and has been offering Bachelor and master's degrees in psychology since then. Further, in winter semester 2007/2008, the PhD programme "Computing in Medicine and Life Sciences" was introduced with the establishment of the Graduate School for Computing in Medicine and Life Sciences at the university.

Currently, the university has around 4,945 students, 160 Professors and 100 lecturers. In 2003 the affiliated teaching hospital of the University of Lübeck was merged with that of the University of Kiel into the university teaching hospital of Schleswig-Holstein, thus making the 2nd largest one in Germany. With a total number of staff over 5,300, the University of Lübeck and its teaching hospital belong to the largest employer in the region of Lübeck.

In 2016, a new, publicly funded interdisciplinary research center, the "Center for Brain, Behavior and Metabolism" (CBBM), was opened on campus. It hosts lab space and offices for 33 research groups working on the intersection of biomedicine and neuroscience.

See also
International School of New Media

References

External links

  

University of Lubeck
Universities and colleges in Schleswig-Holstein
Educational institutions established in 1964
1964 establishments in West Germany